Grevillea guthrieana, commonly known as Guthrie's grevillea, is a species of flowering plant in the family Proteaceae and is endemic to New South Wales. It is a spreading shrub with oblong leaves and clusters of two to six green and maroon flowers.

Description

Taxonomy
Grevillea guthrieana was first formally described in 1994 by Peter M. Olde and Neil R. Marriott in the journal Telopea from specimens collected by Olde near Booral in 1992. The specific epithet (guthrieana) honours Christine Guthrie, for her assistance to the authors.

Distribution and habitat
Guthrie's grevillea grows in moist forest in three disjunct populations near Booral, near Mount Banda Banda and on the Carrai Plateau west of Kempsey.

Conservation status
Grevillea guthrieana is listed as "endangered" under the Australian Government Environment Protection and Biodiversity Conservation Act 1999 and the New South Wales Government Biodiversity Conservation Act 2016. The main threats to the species include weed invasion, road construction and maintenance, and grazing.

References

guthrieana
Flora of New South Wales
Proteales of Australia
Plants described in 1994